The conductor Otto Klemperer made many recordings. The first table, below, shows his recordings from his first, in 1924, to 1954, the year in which he first recorded with the Philharmonia, which played on most of his subsequent recordings until his retirement in 1972.

1924 to 1954

second tranche in preparation. Earlier list left below for the time being

 Bach: St Matthew Passion with Dietrich Fischer-Dieskau, Peter Pears, Elisabeth Schwarzkopf, Christa Ludwig, and Walter Berry
 Bach: Mass in B minor
 Bach: Brandenburg Concertos with the Philharmonia Orchestra on ΕΜΙ
 Bartók: Viola Concerto (with William Primrose, and the Concertgebouw Orchestra, live version on Archiphon)
 Beethoven: Symphony cycles (notably the one from the mid-1950s on EMI)
 Beethoven: Symphony No. 9 (recorded live, November 1957 and also in 1961)
 Beethoven: Fidelio (both the live recording from Covent Garden on Testament, and the studio EMI recording)
 Beethoven: Missa solemnis
 Beethoven: Piano Concertos Nos. 3–5, (with Claudio Arrau, live versions issued on Testament)
 Beethoven: Piano Concertos Nos. 1–5, (with Daniel Barenboim, on EMI)
 Brahms: Symphony cycles
 Brahms: Symphony No. 3, Philharmonia Orchestra, Columbia C90933, in 1957
 Brahms: Violin Concerto, with David Oistrakh
 Brahms: Ein deutsches Requiem, Philharmonia Orchestra with Elisabeth Schwarzkopf and Dietrich Fischer-Dieskau, 1961 EMI recording
 Bruckner: Symphony No. 4 in E-flat Major
 Bruckner: Symphony No. 5 in B-flat Major, New Philharmonia Orchestra, march 1967 on Columbia SAX 5288
 Bruckner: Symphony No. 6 in A Major, New Philharmonia Orchestra, 1964 on Columbia SMC 91437
 Bruckner: Symphony No. 7 in E Major, Symphonieorchester des Bayerischen Rundfunks, 1957
 Bruckner: Symphony No. 9 in D Minor with New York Philharmonic, 1934, and with New Philharmonia on EMI
 Chopin: Piano Concerto No. 1 with Claudio Arrau, live version issued on Music & Arts
 Franck: Symphony in D minor
 Handel: Messiah, with Elisabeth Schwarzkopf, Grace Hoffman, Nicolai Gedda, and Jerome Hines
 Haydn: Symphonies 88, 92, 95, 98, 100, 101, 102, 104
 Hindemith: Nobilissima Visione Suite (Kölner Rundfunk-Sinfonie-Orchester, a 1954 version issued on Andante)
 Janáček: Sinfonietta (a 1951 Concertgebouw Orchestra live version, released by Archiphon)
 Mahler: Das Lied von der Erde, with Christa Ludwig and Fritz Wunderlich, New Philharmonia Orchestra, 1967 on EMI YAX 3282
 Mahler: Symphony No. 2 in C Minor, "Resurrection", (1)1951 with Kathleen Ferrier & Jo Vincent; (2)1963 with Elisabeth Schwarzkopf & Hilde Rössel-Majdan
 Mahler: Symphony No. 4, Philharmonia Orchestra with Elisabeth Schwarzkopf, 1961, on Columbia SAX 2441
 Mahler: Symphony No. 7, 1968
 Mahler: Symphony No. 9
 Mendelssohn: Symphonies Nos. 3-4
 Mendelssohn: A Midsummer Night's Dream
 Mozart: Piano Concerto No. 25 (with Daniel Barenboim)
 Mozart: Symphonies Nos. 25, 29, 31, 33, 34, 35, 36, 38, 39, 40 and 41
 Mozart: Don Giovanni (live version issued on Testament)
 Mozart: The Magic Flute, with Nicolai Gedda, Walter Berry, Gundula Janowitz, Lucia Popp, Elisabeth Schwarzkopf as the First Lady
 Schoenberg: Verklärte Nacht (a 1955 live version with the Concertgebouw Orchestra, on Archiphon)
 Schubert: Symphonies 5, 8 (Unfinished) and 9. Philharmonia Orchestra (EMI)
 Schumann: Symphonies 1–4, with the Philharmonia Orchestra. 
 Schumann: Piano Concerto (with Annie Fischer)
 Stravinsky: Petrushka
 Stravinsky: Pulcinella
 Stravinsky: Symphony in Three Movements
 Tchaikovsky: Symphonies Nos. 4,  5 and  6 with the Philharmonia Orchestra on EMI
 Wagner: Der fliegende Holländer (with Anja Silja)
 Wagner: Siegfried Idyll in the original chamber version with members of the Philharmonia Orchestra
 Weill: Kleine Dreigroschenmusik, 1931, 1967
Source: Discographies in Volumes 1 and 2 of Peter Heyworth's biography of Klemperer.

References

Sources

Discographies of classical conductors